MYTILINEOS S.A. is a Greece-based industrial conglomerate whose business units are active in the sectors of metallurgy, energy and EPC. The company, which was founded in 1990 as a metallurgical company of international trade and participations, is an evolution of an old metallurgical family business which began its activity in 1908.

References

Holding companies of Greece
Engineering companies of Greece
Mining companies of Greece
Conglomerate companies established in 1990
Holding companies established in 1990
Mytilineos SA
Non-renewable resource companies established in 1990
Companies listed on the Athens Exchange
Greek companies established in 1990